Ryan Guzman (born September 21, 1987) is an American actor and former model, known for his lead roles as Sean Asa in Step Up Revolution and Step Up: All In, part of the Step Up film series, as Noah Sandborn in the erotic psychological thriller The Boy Next Door and as Edmundo "Eddie" Diaz in the Fox procedural drama 9-1-1.

Early life 
Guzman was born in Abilene, Texas to Ramón Guzmán Jr., an immigrant from Mexico and Lisa Anne, a Californian with English, German, French, Dutch and Swedish ancestry, and has a younger brother, Steven.  His family later moved to his mother's hometown of Sacramento, California, where he graduated from West Campus High School in 2005 and attended Sierra College.  Guzman started Taekwondo at the age of seven and continued on to earn his Black Belt at the age of ten.  He also played baseball in high school and college but was forced to give it up due to a shoulder injury and an unsuccessful surgery.

Career 
Before going into acting, Guzman was a mixed martial arts fighter, until his fighting license expired in 2010, plus a print and commercial model with Wilhelmina Models and Look Model Agency from the age of 18, when he moved to San Francisco.  He modelled for Abercrombie & Fitch and Reebok, as well as starred in television commercials for Old Navy, Gillette, among others.  Guzman began auditioning for acting roles and landed the lead role as Sean Asa in the fourth movie in the Step Up film series, Step Up Revolution in 2012, despite having no formal training in dancing, "my first dance lesson was ‘Step Up Revolution’."  He added, it was "by luck. I think everybody was drunk when they saw me audition. No, it was a long process: four acting and six dancing auditions. The director, Scott Speer, said there was some kind of magic between me and Kathryn (McCormick) he wanted to have in the movie."  He reprised the lead role as Sean Asa in 2014, in the sequel, the fifth and final instalment of the film series, Step Up: All In.  Coming back into the high-energy franchise, Guzman said, "The hardest thing is matching my skill level to the professional dancers who’ve been dancing for 25 years,” adding that, “acting like I can dance is one thing, but making it believable to the audience is another. I’m training nonstop with these dancers, learning the ins and outs and everything I can to make it look like I’m as good as they are.”  He also credited his mixed martial arts training, "the discipline and determination I had to have for martial arts, I carry on as an actor.”

Between the two Step Up films, Guzman starred in two other films in 2014, There's Always Woodstock and April Rain.  He also made his television debut as a recurring cast member in the ABC Family's television adaptation of Sara Shepard's Pretty Little Liars, as Jake in the fourth season.  His character was originally supposed to be on the show for only one or two episodes, he explained, "I think I got along with the cast and the producers liked how I was playing Jake, so they slowly started writing me into the show more."  Jake remained in the show for nine episodes.  In 2015, Guzman starred as an extremely intelligent student, Noah Sandborn, in the titular role of The Boy Next Door, an American erotic psychological thriller film, opposite Jennifer Lopez, as his teacher Claire, who he had a brief affair with at her school, and then pursued her aggressively.  Guzman explained how he prepared for the role,  

Guzman's first main role in a television series was the NBC's superhero drama Heroes Reborn, as a continuation of Heroes.  He starred as Carlos Gutierrez, a war hero who lives in Los Angeles with his brother Oscar and nephew José.  In 2018 he joined the second season of 9-1-1 as a main cast member, playing LAFD firefighter Edmundo "Eddie" Diaz.

Personal life

Guzman and his fiancée, Brazilian actress Chrysti Ane, welcomed their first child, a son on January 24, 2019.  The couple named their son Mateo Lopes, Guzman explained in an interview with Entertainment Tonight prior to the birth, "My mom ran a daycare for most of my life and one of the kids she watched after was named Mateo, He was one of the sweetest kids. As soon as I found out I was having a son, I pictured this little kid." They welcomed their second child, a daughter named Genevieve Valentina on January 7, 2021.

Filmography

Film

Television

References

External links

 
 
 
 

1987 births
21st-century American male actors
American male actors of Mexican descent
American male film actors
American male television actors
American people of Dutch descent
American people of English descent
American people of French descent
American people of German descent
American people of Swedish descent
Living people
Male actors from California
Male actors from Sacramento, California
Male actors from Texas
People from Abilene, Texas
Sierra College alumni